In computer science, a multimap (sometimes also multihash, multidict or multidictionary) is a generalization of a map or associative array abstract data type in which more than one value may be associated with and returned for a given key. Both map and multimap are particular cases of containers (for example, see C++ Standard Template Library containers). Often the multimap is implemented as a map with lists or sets as the map values.

Examples
 In a student enrollment system, where students may be enrolled in multiple classes simultaneously, there might be an association for each enrollment of a student in a course, where the key is the student ID and the value is the course ID. If a student is enrolled in three courses, there will be three associations containing the same key.
 The index of a book may report any number of references for a given index term, and thus may be coded as a multimap from index terms to any number of reference locations or pages.
 Querystrings may have multiple values associated with a single field. This is commonly generated when a web form allows multiple check boxes or selections to be chosen in response to a single form element.

Language support

C++
C++'s Standard Template Library provides the multimap container for the sorted multimap using a self-balancing binary search tree, and SGI's STL extension provides the hash_multimap container, which implements a multimap using a hash table.

As of C++11, the Standard Template Library provides the unordered_multimap for the unordered multimap.

Dart
Quiver provides a Multimap for Dart.

Java
Apache Commons Collections provides a MultiMap interface for Java. It also provides a MultiValueMap implementing class that makes a MultiMap out of a Map object and a type of Collection.

Google Guava provides a Multimap interface and implementations of it.

Python
Python provides a collections.defaultdict class that can be used to create a multimap. The user can instantiate the class as collections.defaultdict(list).

OCaml
OCaml's standard library module Hashtbl implements a hash table where it's possible to store multiple values for a key.

Scala
The Scala programming language's API also provides Multimap and implementations.

See also
 Abstract data type for the concept of type in general
 Associative array for the more fundamental abstract data type
 Multiset for the case where same item can appear several times

References

Associative arrays
Abstract data types